College Kumar is a 2017 Indian Kannada language romantic comedy film written and directed by Hari Santhosh. It stars Vikky Varun and Samyuktha Hegde, with P. Ravishankar, Shruti and Achyuth Kumar in supporting roles. The score and soundtrack for the film are by Arjun Janya and the cinematography is by A. Azhagan.

The film was released on 10 November 2017. The film got positive response all over. Performances of Ravishankar and Shruti were praised by critics and audience alike. The film was remade by the director in Tamil and Telugu in 2020 with the same title.

Cast

 Vikky Varun as Kumar
 Samyuktha Hegde as Keerti
 P. Ravishankar as Shivakumar
 Shruti as Girija
 Achyuth Kumar
 Sadhu Kokila
 Prakash Belawadi
 Suchitra
 Ramesh Pandith 
 Sundar Raj
 Ashwin Rao Pallakki
Prashanth Siddi 
Sunethra Pandith 
Rockline Sudhakar 
Vijay Koundinya 
Mandya Jayaram 
M. N. Suresh 
Sunethra Pandith 
Ganesh Rao Kesarkar 
Honnavalli krishna 
Dingri Nagaraj

Soundtrack

The film's background score and the soundtracks are composed by Arjun Janya. The music rights were acquired by Jhankar Music.

Reception 
A critic from The Times of India wrote that "This is a film that parents and children could watch together — it sort of paints a picture of what is the norm in many families". A critic from Bangalore Mirror wrote that "The director has reinvented himself with College Kumar, which is a safe bet for the audience". A critic from Deccan Chronicle wrote that "without an iota of doubt it is certainly a bearable movie which has some true emotional moments to watch out for.

References

External links
 
 College Kumar movie info

2017 films
2010s Kannada-language films
2017 romantic comedy films
Indian romantic comedy films
Films scored by Arjun Janya
Kannada films remade in other languages
Films directed by Hari Santhosh